Mezzoramia is a dark albedo feature (region) located at  on Titan, the largest moon of the planet Saturn. It is named after Mezzoramia, a mythical African oasis of happiness from Italian legend.

References

Surface features of Titan (moon)